Albania is a small predominantly mountainous country between Southern and Southeastern Europe, facing the Adriatic and Ionian seas within the Mediterranean sea. The diverse morphological, climatic and hydrological conditions of Albania favour the formation of a large number of geological features.

List of rock formations in Albania

See also  
 Protected areas of Albania
 Geography of Albania

References 

 

Mountain passes of Albania
Mountain passes